Jan Paweł is a Polish compound given name equivalent to John Paul (given name).

Jan Pawel or Jan Paweł or variation may refer to:

People

Given name "Jan Pawel"
 Jan Paweł II, the first Polish pope
 Jan Paweł Biretowski (1705-1781), Polish scholar
 Jan Paweł Kruk (born 1943), Polish actor
 Jan Paweł Lelewel (1796-1847), Polish military engineer
 Jan Paweł Łuszczewski (1764-1812), Polish politician
 Jan Paweł Nowacki (1905-1979), German-Pole electrical engineer
 Jan Paweł Pietrzak (1984-2008), see Murder of Jan Pawel and Quiana Jenkins Pietrzak

Given name Jan + Pawel
 Jan Ziobro (politician) (born 1989, as Jan Paweł Ziobro), Polish politician
 Jan Pawłowski (born 1992, as Jan Paweł Pawłowski), Polish soccer player
 Jan P. Matuszyński (born 1984, as Jan Paweł Matuszyński), Polish director
 Jan Puzyna de Kosielsko (1842-1911, born as Prince Jan Duklan Maurycy Paweł Puzyna de Kosielsko), Polish cardinal
 Jan A. P. Kaczmarek (born 1953, as Jan Andrzej Paweł Kaczmarek), Polish composer
 Jan Bednarek (politician) (born 1955, as Jan Paweł Bednarek), Polish politician

Other uses
Jana Pawla or Jana Pawła, the Polish genitive form of "Jan Pawel", may refer to:

 Kraków Airport im. Jana Pawła II (John Paul II Airport in Krakow)
 Muzeum Kolekcji Jana Pawła II w Warszawie (John Paul II Museum Collection of Warsaw)
 Muzeum Katedralne im. Jana Pawla II na Wawelu (John Paul II Cathedral Museum in Wawel)
 Katolicki Uniwersytet Lubelski Jana Pawła II (John Paul II Catholic University at Lublin)
 Stadion Jana Pawla II (John Paul II Stadium), Krakow, Poland

See also

 Paweł Jan Sapieha (1609-1665), Lithuanian nobleman of the Polish-Lithuanian Commonwealth
 Paweł Jan Działyński (1594-1643), Polish voivode governor
 
 
 
 
 John Paul (disambiguation)
 Pawel, a given name 
 Pawla (disambiguation)
 Jana (disambiguation)
 Jan (disambiguation)